"End of the Line" is a song by the British-American supergroup the Traveling Wilburys. It was the final track on their debut album Traveling Wilburys Vol. 1, released in October 1988. It was also issued in January 1989 as the band's second single. The recording features all the Wilburys except Bob Dylan as lead singers; George Harrison, Jeff Lynne and Roy Orbison sing the choruses in turn, while Tom Petty sings the verses. The song was mainly written by Harrison and was assigned to his publishing company, Umlaut Corporation. However, all five members of the group received a songwriting credit in keeping with the collaborative concept behind the Wilburys project.

In the United States, the single peaked at No. 63 on the Billboard Hot 100 chart and at No. 2 on the Album Rock Tracks chart, blocked from the top spot by both "Driven Out" by The Fixx and "Working on It" by Chris Rea. In the United Kingdom, the single peaked at No. 52 on the UK Singles Chart.

Music video 
The music video for "End of the Line" was directed by Willy Smax and filmed in Los Angeles in December 1988. Set in a moving passenger car (carriage) pulled by a steam locomotive, it features Dylan playing guitar and session musician Jim Keltner (credited as Buster Sidebury on the albums) playing brushes. As Orbison died after recording his vocals but before the video was shot, a shot of a guitar sitting in a rocking chair and a photo of him are shown when his vocals are heard.

Legacy 
The song was used over the end credits of the final episode of the British sitcom One Foot in the Grave and the American comedy Parks and Recreation.

"End of the Line" appeared in the George Harrison-produced cult comedy Checking Out.

The song has also been included in TV spots for the 2004 film The Terminal, as well as the trailer for the 2007 hit comedy Knocked Up.

Tom Petty and the Heartbreakers played this song live during their 2008 North American tour.

Harrison was honoured in the parody song "No Where Near the End of My Time" by radio on-air personality Bob Rivers.

The song was used on the end credits of the Australian family comedy film Red Dog: True Blue in 2016 and for an episode of HBO's Crashing in 2018.

It was also used in the trailer for the 2023 Tom Hanks movie, A Man Called Otto.

Track listing
7" single, cassette single
A "End of the Line" (LP version) – 3:30
B "Congratulations" (LP version) – 3:30

12" single, 3" CD single
A "End of the Line" (extended version) – 5:34
B "Congratulations" (LP version) – 3:29

Personnel
George Harrison – lead vocals (1st, 4th, and 7th choruses), acoustic guitar, slide guitar, backing vocals
Tom Petty – lead vocals (verses), acoustic guitar, backing vocals
Jeff Lynne – lead vocals (2nd, 5th, and 6th choruses), electric guitar, bass guitar, backing vocals
Roy Orbison – lead vocals (3rd chorus), acoustic guitar, backing vocals
Bob Dylan – acoustic guitar, backing vocals
Jim Keltner – drums, backing vocals

Charts

Weekly charts

Year-end charts

Certifications

References

External links
"End of the Line" at Discogs

1988 songs
1989 singles
Traveling Wilburys songs
Songs written by George Harrison
Songs written by Bob Dylan
Songs written by Jeff Lynne
Songs written by Roy Orbison
Songs written by Tom Petty
Song recordings produced by Jeff Lynne
Song recordings produced by George Harrison
Music published by Oops Publishing and Ganga Publishing, B.V.